The Wiener Stadtliga is an Austrian Landesliga conference, one of the fourth-highest soccer leagues in Austrian football.

Mode
In the Wiener Stadtliga, a total of 16 football clubs from Vienna and the neighboring province of Lower Austria participate. All clubs are members of the Vienna Football Association. The champion of Wiener Stadtliga rises directly in the third-highest division of Austria, the Austrian Regional League East. In addition to the champion of the Wiener Stadtliga, also the champions of Landesliga Burgenland and 1. Niederösterreichische Landesliga are promoted to the Regional League East. Below the Wiener Stadtliga, there are the 2. Landesliga as fifth-highest division followed by Oberliga A and Oberliga B as sixth-highest division, as well as the 1. Klasse A and 1. Klasse B as the seventh-highest divisions for Viennese clubs followed by the 2. Klasse A.

2020–21 member clubs 

ASV 13
FV Austria XIII
SV Donau
FACH Donaufeld
ASK Elektra
Favoritner AC
First Vienna FC
SV Gerasdorf Stammersdorf
SC Mannswörth
Sportunion Mauer
Post SV Wien
SV Schwechat
SK Slovan-Hütteldorfer AC
FC Stadlau
WAF Vorwärts Brigittenau
SV Wienerberg 1921

References

Football competitions in Austria
Football in Austria